There are two places in the United States named Ramsey County:
Ramsey County, Minnesota, the seat of the state capital, Saint Paul
Ramsey County, North Dakota